This is a list of Academy Award winners and nominees who are of Asian descent. This list is current as of the 95th Academy Awards.

Best Picture

Best Director

Best Actor

Best Actress

Best Supporting Actor

Best Supporting Actress

Best Original Screenplay

Best Adapted Screenplay

Best Cinematography

Best Costume Design

Best Film Editing

Best International Feature Film
The Academy Award for Best International Feature Film is awarded to countries, not individuals. This list contains directors of nominated films of Asian descent, who typically accept the award on behalf of their country.

Best Makeup and Hairstyling

Best Production Design

Best Original Score

Best Original Song

Best Sound
Prior to the 93rd Academy Awards, the Best Sound Mixing and Best Sound Editing were separate categories.

Best Visual Effects

Best Documentary Feature

Best Animated Feature

Best Documentary Short Subject

Best Animated Short Film

Best Live Action Short Film

Honorary Awards

Non-Competitive Awards

See also
List of Asian Golden Globe winners and nominees
List of Asian Tony Award winners and nominees

References

Asian
Asian-American cinema
Academy
Lists of Asian people